The Centaur and the Phoenix is an album by multi-instrumentalist Yusef Lateef recorded in 1960 and released on the Riverside label.

Reception

The Allmusic review by Stacia Proefrock stated the performance "takes the risks and the innovations that Lateef was known for, and expands them in a number of different directions all at once, leading to an album that bursts with new ideas and textures, while remaining accessible, and above all, beautiful. Lateef seems eager here to take the next step musically by breaking the mold of his previous albums".

Track listing 
All compositions by Yusef Lateef except as indicated
 "Revelation" (Kenny Barron) - 6:02
 "Apathy" - 5:25
 "Ev'ry Day (I Fall in Love)" (Sammy Fain, Irving Kahal) - 6:59
 "The Centaur and the Phoenix" (Charles Mills) - 5:37
 "Iqbal" - 4:51
 "Summer Song" (Mills) - 5:26
 "The Philanthropist" - 4:02
Bonus tracks on CD reissue:
"Jungle Fantasy" (Esy Morales) - 2:42
 "Titora" (Billy Taylor) - 2:25

Personnel 
Yusef Lateef - tenor saxophone, flute, arghul, oboe
Richard Williams - trumpet
Clark Terry - flugelhorn, trumpet
Curtis Fuller - trombone
Josea Taylor - bassoon
Tate Houston - baritone saxophone
Joe Zawinul - piano
Ben Tucker - bass
Lex Humphries - drums
Kenny Barron - arranger.

References 

Yusef Lateef albums
1960 albums
Albums produced by Orrin Keepnews
Riverside Records albums